Burttianthus is a genus of flowering plants belonging to the family Araceae.

Its native range is Borneo.

Species:

Burttianthus caulescens 
Burttianthus hansenii 
Burttianthus longipedunculatus 
Burttianthus orestus 
Burttianthus purseglovei 
Burttianthus spissus 
Burttianthus veluntandrus

References

Araceae
Araceae genera